Confucian coin charms are a category of Chinese and Vietnamese numismatic charms that incorporate messages from Confucian philosophy into their inscriptions. Generally these amulets resemble Chinese cash coins but contain messages of the traditions, rituals, and moral code of Confucianism, such as the idea of "filial piety" (孝) and the Confucian ideals of "righteousness" (義). During the 19th century these Confucian messages were also featured on a number of 1 mạch Vietnamese cash coins during the Nguyễn dynasty.

Themes  

Confucian charms are Chinese and Vietnamese numismatic charms that depict the traditions, rituals, and moral code of Confucianism, such as filial piety and "righteousness". Examples of Confucian charms would include a charm that depicts Shenzi carrying firewood on a shoulder pole, open-work charms depicting stories from "The Twenty-Four Examples of Filial Piety" (二十四孝), the "five relationships" (五倫), Meng Zong kneeling beside bamboo, Dong Yong (a Han dynasty era man) working a hoe, Wang Xiang with a fishingpole. Confucian inscriptions include fù cí zǐ xiào (父慈子孝, "the father is kind and the son is filial") read clockwise, yí chū fèi fǔ (義出肺腑, "righteousness comes from the bottom of one's heart"), zhōng jūn xiào qīn (忠君孝親, "be loyal to the sovereign and honor one's parents"), huā è shuāng huī (花萼雙輝, "petals and sepals both shine"), and jìng xiōng ài dì (敬兄愛第, "revere older brothers and love younger brothers"). 

Confucian beliefs of good fortune, longevity, gaining a high government official position, and wealth can be seen at many other categories of Chinese numismatic charms, such as Chinese charms with auspicious inscriptions, good fortune and longevity charms, open-work charms, and chinese pendant charms, among any other categories.

Confucian open-work charms

Confucian filial piety  

Some Chinese open-work charms depict the concept of filial piety from Confucianism, for example there is an open-work charm which displays four stories from "The Twenty-Four Examples of Filial Piety", in these stories examples are given of how children should obey their parents and respect the elderly which are all central themes of Confucianism. These open-work charms are also part of a larger family of Confucian charms.

Pavilions or temples 

Open-work charms depicting pavilions and temples first started appearing during the Song dynasty, and the majority of these are thought to have been manufactured in the city of Dali. An example of an open-work charm with a pavilion in its design possibly depicts the "Temple of Confucius", within the pavilion of this charm  musician is seen playing the guqin while outside of the building two men are seen playing weiqi. Outside of the pavilion bamboo plants and longevity stones could be seen. It is believed that the people in this charm represent Confucius himself.

Confucian messages on Vietnamese cash coins  

Under the Nguyễn dynasty era Emperor Minh Mạng large (often 48 millimeters in diameter) presentation coins with the inscription Minh Mạng Thông Bảo (明命通寶) were made that featured inscriptions from the Huainanzi on their reverse, it is believed that this work was chosen because it states that a monarch or ruler should embrace both Confucianism and Taoism and attain sagehood. Because the term Minh Mạng (Hán tự: 明命) can also be translated as "bright life" or "intelligent decree" the inscription Minh Mạng Thông Bảo is commonly used on Vietnamese numismatic charms.

There are at least seventeen known varieties of this large denomination Minh Mạng Thông Bảo with a four-character inscription and 23 known varieties of the Minh Mạng Thông Bảo with an eight-character inscription.

Tadpole script charms  

Some Confucian coin charms have inscriptions written in the tadpole script variety of seal script, these Confucian coin charms convey Confucian messages or the act of honouring one's ancestors through proverbs taken out of old stories. Examples of these coin charms a Chinese numismatic charm with free inscription "bu tan wei bao" (不貪為寶) which translates into English as "not being greedy is a treasure". This Confucian tadpole script coin charm is a reference to a story from the Commentary of Zuo, in this story a peasant came to see Zi Han (子罕, zi hǎn) who was a high level government official of the ancient State of Song. The peasant had found a valuable jade stone of which its value was confirmed by an expert. The peasant wanted to present this piece of jade to Zi Han, but the official had then refused to accept the jade. In response to the stone Zi Han said to the peasant, "You consider the jade to be a treasure while I consider 'not being greedy' to be a treasure" (示玉人，玉人以為寶也，故敢獻之。). Further Zi Han stated that "If I receive the jade, you will have lost your treasure and I, too, will have lost my treasure. It would be better if both of us keep our own personal treasures" (我以不貪為寶，爾以玉為寶，若以與我，皆喪寶也。 不若人有其寶。). The reverse of this coin charm shows sycees and a large number of the Chinese character "tian" (田), which means "field" as in farm land. The sycees represent silver and the Chinese character "tian" represents farm land which was a symbol of wealth in ancient China.

Another example of a Confucian tadpole script coin charm has the obverse inscription qīng bái chuán jiā (清白傳家, "Pureness handed down in the family"), which is a reference to Yang Zhen (样震), a Han dynasty government official and the prefecture governour of Jingzhou who was known for both his erudition and his impeccable moral character. The inscription on this coin is a reference to a story where Yang Zhen while on the way to Jingzhou, had passed through Changyi prefecture (昌邑县). In this prefecture he met an old friend named Wang Mi (王密), who had come out late at night to meet him. As Yang Zhen had appointed Wang Mi as the Changyi prefecture head (昌邑县长), Wang Mi wanted to thank him by giving him catties of gold, in response Yang Zhen had refused the gold. In response to the declined offer Yang Zhen said to Wang Mi, "This old friend knows you but why is it that you do not know your old friend?" (朋友知道你，你為什麼不知道老朋友呢？) To which Wang Mi replied, "It is now the middle of the night, no one will know." (現在是深夜，沒有人會知道。), to which Yang Zhen replied, "Heaven knows, the spirits know, I know and you know. How can you say that no one would know?" (天知、神知、我知、你知，怎麼說沒有人知道呢。), after which Wang Mi departed feeling very ashamed of his words and actions. In this story Yang Zhen felt that an untarnished reputation would be the greatest legacy that he could leave to his descendants and this charm reminds its owner of this sense of Confucian moral integrity. 

These "Legacy of an Untarnished Reputation" coin charms first appeared in China during the Song dynasty period and usually have a diameter of 62.5 millimeters, a thickness of 4 millimeters, and they tend to have a weight of 62.9 grams. But specimens are known to have a diameter as large as around 90 millimeters.

List of Confucian coin charm inscriptions  
 

List of Confucian coin charm inscriptions and themes:

Notes

References

Sources 

 Amulets of Vietnam by Craig Greenbaum. Published: 2006. Retrieved: 23 February 2020. 
 Edgar J.Mandel. Metal Charms and Amulets of China. 

 

Chinese numismatic charms
Confucianism